Jiří Pospíšil (born 26 February 1973) is a Czech former professional cyclo-cross cyclist.

Major results

1990–1991
 2nd  UCI Junior World Championships
1995–1996
 1st  National Championships
 1st Kolin
 1st Kosumberg
 UCI World Cup
3rd Igorre
3rd Prague
 Superprestige
3rd Plzeň
1996–1997
 1st Teplice
 1st Sankt-Gallen
 1st Lostice
 1st Holé Vrchy
 1st Magstadt
 2nd National Championships
 2nd Igorre
1997–1998
 1st Igorre
 1st Mlada Boleslav
 1st Cologne
 1st Holé Vrchy
 1st Mlada Boleslav
 2nd National Championships
1998–1999
 1st  National Championships
 1st Podborany
 1st Namest
 1st Mlada Boleslav
 1st Hermanuv Mestec
 1st Trèves
 1st Orlová
 2nd Igorre
 9th UCI World Championships
1999–2000
 1st Loštice
 1st Ostelsheim
 UCI World Cup
3rd Safenwil 
2000–2001
 1st Ostelsheim
 1st Dagmersellen
 2nd National Championships
 3rd Igorre
 3rd Petange
 3rd Steinmaur
 5th UCI World Championships
2001–2002
 1st  National Championships
 1st Overall Budvar Cup
1st Louny
1st Podborany
1st Plzeň
 1st Steinmaur
 1st Ostelsheim
 3rd Azencross
 3rd Dagmersellen
2002–2003
 1st Aigle
 1st Podborany
 1st Lostice
 1st Ostelsheim
 1st Holé Vrchy
 1st Zürich-Waid
 1st Meilen
 3rd Igorre
 3rd Dagmersellen
 9th UCI World Championships
2003–2004
 1st Igorre
 1st Ostelsheim
 1st Podborany
 1st Meilen
 1st Rüti
 1st Holé Vrchy
 UCI World Cup
2nd Sankt Wendel 
 2nd Lanarvily
 2nd Grand Prix du Nouvel-An
 3rd Grote Prijs De Ster
2004–2005
 Budvar Cup
1st Podbořany
1st Hlinsko
3rd Loštice
 1st Hittnau
 1st Dagmersellen
 1st Grand Prix des Assurances Axa
 1st Holé Vrchy
 1st Herford
 1st Kayl
 2nd GP Ayuntamiento de Ispaster
2005–2006
 Budvar Cup
1st Podbořany

References

External links

1973 births
Living people
Czech male cyclists
Cyclo-cross cyclists
People from Bakov nad Jizerou
Sportspeople from the Central Bohemian Region